Senator Chaney may refer to:

John Chaney (congressman) (1790–1881), Ohio State Senate
Mike Chaney (born 1944), Mississippi State Senate

See also
Senator Cheney (disambiguation)